The concept of communicative competence, as developed in linguistics, originated in response to perceived inadequacy of the notion of linguistic competence. That is, communicative competence encompasses a language user's grammatical knowledge of syntax, morphology, phonology and the like, but reconceives this knowledge as a functional, social understanding of how and when to use utterances appropriately.

Communicative language teaching is a pedagogical application of communicative competence.

The understanding of communicative competence has been influenced by the field of pragmatics and the philosophy of language, including work on speech acts.

Origin
The term was coined by Dell Hymes in 1966, reacting against the perceived inadequacy of Noam Chomsky's (1965) distinction between linguistic competence and performance. To address Chomsky's abstract notion of competence, Hymes undertook ethnographic exploration of communicative competence that included "communicative form and function in integral relation to each other". The approach pioneered by Hymes is now known as the ethnography of communication.

Applications
The notion of communicative competence is one of the theories that underlies the communicative approach to foreign language teaching. At least three core models exist. The first and most widely used is Canale and Swain's model and the later iteration by Canale. In a second model, sociocultural content is more precisely specified by Celce-Murcia, Dornyei, and Thurrell in 1995. For their part, they saw communicative competence as including linguistic competence, strategic competence, sociocultural competence, actional competence, and discourse competence. A third model widely in use in federal language training in Canada is Bachman and Palmer's model.

References

Bibliography

Further reading

 

Sociolinguistics
Language acquisition